In mathematics, the bimonster is a group that is the wreath product of the monster group M with Z2:

The Bimonster is also a quotient of the Coxeter group corresponding to the Dynkin diagram Y555, a Y-shaped graph with 16 nodes:

 

John H. Conway conjectured that a presentation of the bimonster could be given by adding a certain extra relation to the presentation defined by the Y555 diagram; this was proved in 1990 by A. A. Ivanov a mathematician not the famous painter and Simon P. Norton.

See also 
 Triality - simple Lie group D4, Y111
 Affine E_6 Y222

References
.
.
.
.
.
.

External links 
  (Note: incorrectly named here as [36,6,6])

Group theory